Jorge Orlando Aravena Plaza (born 22 April 1958) is a Chilean former footballer. A left-footed attacking midfielder or deep-lying forward, he played for several clubs in Latin America and Europe, including Club Deportivo Universidad Católica, Deportivo Cali and Puebla F.C. Today, Aravena is considered a major figure in the history of these clubs.
In addition, Aravena has managed several clubs in Chile and Latin America.

Aravena also represented the Chile national football team. He earned 36 caps in the 1980s, scoring 22 goals.

Throughout his career Jorge Aravena scored 285 goals, making him the fifth top scorer in the history of Chilean football and the highest scorer among midfielders.

Honours

Club
Universidad Católica
 Copa Chile (1): 1983
 Primera División de Chile (1): 1984

Puebla
 Primera División (1): 1989–90
 Copa México (1): 1989–90

Unión Española
 Copa Chile (1): 1992

Individual
 Copa Chile Top scorer (1): 1983
 1986 FIFA World Cup Qualification Top scorer
 Colombian Primera División Top scorer (1): 1987
 Mexican Primera División Golden Ball: 1989–90
 Copa Mexico Top scorer (1): 1989–90

References

External links
 Los Reyes del Gol: Jorge Aravena
 

1958 births
Living people
Footballers from Santiago
Chilean footballers
Chilean expatriate footballers
Chile international footballers
1983 Copa América players
Association football forwards
Club Deportivo Universidad Católica footballers
Santiago Morning footballers
Naval de Talcahuano footballers
Real Valladolid players
Deportivo Cali footballers
Club Puebla players
Associação Portuguesa de Desportos players
Unión Española footballers
Audax Italiano footballers
Primera B de Chile players
Chilean Primera División players
Categoría Primera A players
Liga MX players
La Liga players
Campeonato Brasileiro Série A players
Chilean expatriate sportspeople in Spain
Chilean expatriate sportspeople in Colombia
Chilean expatriate sportspeople in Mexico
Chilean expatriate sportspeople in Brazil
Expatriate footballers in Spain
Expatriate footballers in Colombia
Expatriate footballers in Mexico
Expatriate footballers in Brazil
Chilean football managers
Chilean expatriate football managers
Audax Italiano managers
Club Deportivo Palestino managers
Santiago Morning managers
Everton de Viña del Mar managers
Club Puebla managers
Cobreloa managers
Lobos BUAP managers
Santiago Wanderers managers
Deportes Valdivia managers
Deportes Puerto Montt managers
Deportes Temuco managers
Chilean Primera División managers
Liga MX managers
Primera B de Chile managers
Peruvian Primera División managers
Expatriate football managers in Mexico
Chilean expatriate sportspeople in Peru
Expatriate football managers in Peru